Very Berry is the debut EP by South Korean girl group Berry Good. The album contains seven tracks and is led by title track "Angel". It was released on April 20, 2016, as result of the crowdfunding campaign launched on March 11 on Makestar. The  goal was reached in ten days.

Track listing

Charts

Sales

References 

2016 EPs
Dance-pop EPs
Korean-language EPs